Western Canadian Place is an office tower complex located in the downtown core of Calgary, Alberta, Canada. It consists of two buildings, the taller North Tower and the shorter South Tower.

It was designed by the architectural firm, Cohos Evamy (the same firm who designed Bankers Hall - East and Bankers Hall - West in Calgary) in late modernist style. The office complex was purchased in 2004 for $230,675,000 by bcIMC and is run for them by GWL Realty Advisors, one of the firms involved in building the structure.

It is the headquarters of Husky Energy and also has offices of APA Corporation.

Towers
The south tower is shorter, standing only 30 storeys for a height of 128 meters (420 feet). The ensemble was completed in 1983.

Photo gallery

See also
List of tallest buildings in Calgary

References

External links
Western Canadian Place official website

Buildings and structures in Calgary
Skyscrapers in Calgary
Office buildings completed in 1983
Headquarters in Canada
Twin towers
Skyscraper office buildings in Canada
Dialog (architectural firm) buildings